Kitano was a Japanese container ship.
She was delivered in Japan in 1990 to Japanese container line NYK and scrapped in China in November 2011.

2001 fire
Kitano left the Port of New York at 0730 on 21 March 2001.
At 1600 Kitanos crew observed that a container had caught fire. The container that caught fire contained 14 tons of activated carbon pellets impregnated with potassium hydroxide (caustic potash). Most of the pellets were in open mesh bags on wooden pallets. Two nearby containers were: "...loaded with barrels of camphene-90 wax, a class 4.1 dangerous cargo."

At 1636 Kitano requested assistance. Halifax, Nova Scotia, Canada was the nearest port. When the vessels were dispatched the wind was at force 8. The weather conditions proved too extreme for the 140-ton Firebird, the Canadian Forces' dedicated fireboat, to leave harbour. The Canadian Coast Guard vessels arrived, but the weather prohibited anything beyond standing by.  and  arrived several hours later.  arrived at 0500 the next morning.

The vessel's Japanese owners contracted for assistance from Secunda Marine Services, the owners of the ocean-going salvage tug .

It was not considered safe to allow Kitano to enter Halifax Harbour for almost 24 hours because of the danger of the fire spreading to the containers filled with camphene-90 wax. Kitanos crew had been fighting the fire without assistance for 25 hours before they received any outside assistance due to the bad weather.

The fire was extinguished by 2215. The contents of fifteen containers were damaged by the fire or by the fire fighting efforts. Kitano departed Halifax on 26 March 2001 with the rest of her cargo.

References

Ships of Japan
1989 ships